Prof. Kausar Bashir Ahmad (9 March 1939 – 9 November 2006) was a Pakistani architect, townplanner and educationist.

References

.

1939 births
2006 deaths
Pakistani architects